Eddie Hinton (born June 26, 1947) is a former American football wide receiver who played six seasons in the National Football League (NFL) for the Baltimore Colts, the Houston Oilers, and the New England Patriots. He now lives just outside of San Antonio, Texas.  He previously worked as a school bus driver for both Comal ISD and New Braunfels ISD. 

1947 births
Living people
Sportspeople from Lawton, Oklahoma
Players of American football from San Antonio
Players of American football from Oklahoma
American football wide receivers
Oklahoma Sooners football players
Baltimore Colts players
Houston Oilers players
New England Patriots players